Spert Island is an island lying off the west extremity of Trinity Island, in the Palmer Archipelago of Antarctica. Charted by the Swedish Antarctic Expedition under Nordenskjold, 1901–04. Named by the United Kingdom Antarctic Place-Names Committee (UK-APC) in 1960 for Sir Thomas Spert, Controller of the King's Ships in the time of Henry VIII, founder and first Master of the Mariners of England, which later became the Corporation of Trinity House.

See also 
 Composite Antarctic Gazetteer
 List of Antarctic and sub-Antarctic islands
 List of Antarctic islands south of 60° S
 SCAR
 Territorial claims in Antarctica

References

External links 

Islands of the Palmer Archipelago